It's a Small World is a 1935 screwball comedy film starring Spencer Tracy and Wendy Barrie, directed by Irving Cummings. In production February 2–March 2, 1935, it was Barrie's American film debut.

Cast
 Spencer Tracy as Bill Shevlin
 Wendy Barrie as Jane Dale
 Raymond Walburn as Judge Julius B. Clummerhorn
 Virginia Sale as Lizzie
 Astrid Allwyn as Nancy Naylor
 Irving Bacon as Cal
 Charles Sellon as Cyclone
 Dick Foran as Motor cop (billed as Nick)
 Belle Daube as Mrs. Dale
 Frank McGlynn, Sr. as Snake Brown, Jr.
 Skippy (dog, uncredited)

References

External links
  It's a Small World in the Internet Movie Database

1935 films
1935 romantic comedy films
Fox Film films
American romantic comedy films
American black-and-white films
1930s English-language films
Films based on American novels
Films directed by Irving Cummings
Films set in Louisiana
1930s American films
Silent romantic comedy films